Eveline Annie Jenkins (July 1893–1976) was a British botanical artist and illustrator.

Biography
Jenkins was born in Monmouthshire, one of the three children of civil servant William Herbert Jenkins and Eveline Jenkins. She was educated at Newport Girls High School and studied for a B.Sc. at the University College of Wales, Aberystwyth, while studying art in her own time. Jenkins took lessons at the Aberystwyth Art School during 1912 and 1913 and, in 1916, spent six weeks at the Stanhope Forbes school in Newlyn. In 1913, she won first prize at the National Eisteddfod for her design for a public fountain. After she graduated, Jenkins worked as a teacher for six years, first in Cornwall and then in Wales. 

In 1927, Jenkins took the post of botanical artist with Amgueddfa Cymru – National Museum Wales, AC-NMW, and held that position until 1959. During that time, her illustrations featured in numerous AC-NMW books, publications and journals. These included the 1961 book Welsh Timber Trees by HA Hyde and AE Wade and in several works on fungi. Her work continues to feature in AC-NMW publications, for example the 2001 Catalogue of Botanical Plants and Drawings of the National Museum of Wales. Jenkins was a member of the South Wales Art Society and her work featured in the 1955 touring exhibition of contemporary Welsh painting and sculpture organised by the Arts Council of Wales. Examples of her work are held by the Contemporary Art Society of Wales and by AC-NMW at the National Museum Cardiff.

References

1893 births
1976 deaths
20th-century Welsh women artists
20th-century Welsh painters
Alumni of Aberystwyth University
Botanical illustrators
People from Monmouthshire 
Welsh women painters